Gustavo Hernández Pérez (born February 21, 1974) is a Venezuelan film director and writer.

Life and career 

Hernández Pérez attended the school of Mass Communications at the Universidad Central de Venezuela. He earned a Master's degree on Film Directing at the AFI Conservatory in Los Angeles, California.  Among his many recognitions, Hernández Pérez was honored with the AFI Franklin J. Schaffner Fellowship Award for Best Director of the Year, and the Directors Guild of America (DGA) announced him as Best Latino Director at The 2003 DGA Student Film Awards. 
 
The Mexican Dream, written and directed by Hernández Pérez, won 13 International Film Festivals. Became National Finalist at The 2003 Student Academy Awards, and was purchased by HBO for a programming rotation of two years.

Filmography

1. Presumption of Death (POD), Feature Film - Crime / Thriller. In Post-Production (2024)

2. El Silbón (The Whistler), Feature Film - Horror / Mystery. In Pre-Production

3. The Mexican Dream, Short Film - Comedy (2003)

4. Juan goes to San Juan, Documentary (1998)

External links
 
 
  

People from Caracas
Venezuelan film directors
Venezuelan screenwriters
1974 births
Living people